Christian Friedrich Wilhelm Jurgen Wullweber (July 1, 1833 Hagenow, Germany – September 22, 1877 Dubuque, Iowa) was the American Resident Minister to Ecuador from 1875 until 1876.

References

Ambassadors of the United States to Ecuador
1833 births
1877 deaths